Vitesse may refer to:

 Vitesse Models, a diecast model car company
 Vitesse (band), Dutch rock band
 Bugatti Veyron Grand Sport Vitesse, a car
 Rover 216 Vitesse, a car
 Rover 3500 Vitesse, a car
 Rover 800 Vitesse, a car
 Triumph Vitesse, a car
 SBV Vitesse, a Dutch football club from Arnhem
 Vitesse Dallas, an American soccer club
 SV Vitesse, a football club from the Netherlands Antilles
 , a United States Navy patrol vessel in commission from 1917 to 1918
 Vitesse Semiconductor, an American company that produces semiconductor solutions for Carrier and Enterprise networks

See also
 VITESS, software package for the simulation of neutron scattering experiments.